T cell receptor beta constant 2 is a protein that in humans is encoded by the TRBC2 gene.

References